Dariusz Marciniak (born 30 October 1966 in Poland; died 27 April 2003 in Poland) was a Polish footballer.

References

Polish footballers
Association football forwards
1966 births
2003 deaths
Poland international footballers